Kerrier District may refer to:

Places
Kerrier, a former administrative district in Cornwall
Kerrier (hundred), one of the hundreds of Cornwall

Music
 Kerrier District (musician), one of a number of names used by the recording artist Luke Vibert
Kerrier District (album), an album by Kerrier District
Kerrier District 2, an album by Kerrier District